The 1922–23 League of Ireland was the second season of the League of Ireland. It started on 16 September 1922 and ended in March 1923.

St James's Gate were the defending champions.

Changes from 1921–22

Team changes
Despite finishing in sixth and eighth place the previous season, Frankfort and YMCA were not re-elected.

Six new teams were elected, extending the League to twelve teams: Athlone Town, Midland Athletic, Pioneers, Rathmines Athletic, Shelbourne United and Shamrock Rovers. Athlone Town became the first team from outside Dublin to compete in the League.

Season overview 
Two matches were not played:

 The match between Rathmines Athletic and Dublin United was awarded as a scoreless win to Dublin United, as Rathmines Athletic resigned from the League before the end of the season.
 The match between Olympia and Athlone Town was awarded as a scoreless draw.

Shamrock Rovers won their first title.

Teams

Table

Results

Top goalscorers

Source:

See also
1922–23 FAI Cup

References

Ireland
League Of Ireland, 1922-23
League of Ireland seasons